Sehon is a surname. Notable people with the surname include:

Alec Sehon (1924–2018), Romanian-born Canadian immunologist
John L. Sehon (1862–1913), American politician
Scott Sehon (born 1963), American philosopher and professor